Edward Moss Carmouche, Sr.  (June 21, 1921 – April 6, 1990), was an attorney in his native Lake Charles, Louisiana, who during the 1960s was a leader of the nationalist faction of the Louisiana Democratic Party.

Background

Carmouche was the eldest child of Paul Frederick Carmouche (1899-1971) and the former Alice Anne Moss  (1899-1996). In 1943, he received his undergraduate degree from Louisiana State University in Baton Rouge and entered the United States Army during World War II, in which he served as a captain in the European Theater of Operations. He received three Bronze Star medals, the Silver Star, the French Croix de Guerre, and the Medaille de la Reconnaissance.

In 1948, Carmouche received the Juris Doctor degree from the University of Virginia Law School in Charlottesville, Virginia. In 1949, he received a Master of Civil Law degree from the Roman Catholic-affiliated Tulane University Law School. In addition to his Carmouche, Martin and Wilson law firm in Lake Charles, he held the presidency of the Lutcher Moore Development Corporation and was as managing partner of Lutcher and Moore Cypress Lumber Company. Carmouche also had law offices in Washington, D.C., Lafayette, New Orleans, and Baton Rouge. At the time of his death, he was the chairman of the board of the Carmouche and Gray law firm.

Legal and political career

From 1952 to 1955, Carmouche was a magistrate judge for the United States District Court for the Western District of Louisiana. He was from 1955 to 1984 an assistant state attorney general under Fred S. LeBlanc, Jack P. F. Gremillion, and William J. Guste. Carmouche was a delegate to both the 1956 and 1960 Democratic national conventions. In 1960, Carmouche served on the party platform committee and was a successful elector candidate for the Kennedy-Johnson ticket, which easily won the ten electoral votes in Louisiana.

In December 1966, Carmouche was elected state party chairman when C. H. "Sammy" Downs, a former member of both houses of the Louisiana State Legislature from Alexandria, resigned to support George Wallace, who as the former governor of Alabama mounted a presidential campaign in 1968 as the nominee of the American Independent Party. As an avowed supporter of U.S. President Lyndon B. Johnson, Carmouche defeated, fifty-four to thirty-eight, the mayor of Monroe, W. L. "Jack" Howard, who carried the support of both Downs and Leander Perez, the political boss of Plaquemines Parish near New Orleans known for his strong segregationist views.

Carmouche was subsequently replaced on December 28, 1967, by Arthur C. Watson, an attorney and a former state representative from Natchitoches.

Death

Carmouche was Presbyterian. He was married to the former Virginia Lanier Martin, who was born in 1923 in Thibodaux, Louisiana. Virginia Carmouche is also an attorney.

The Carmouches had five children, two of whom are  deceased: Pierre Auguste Carmouche (1958-2003) and William Paul Carmouche (lived less than one month in 1952). Carmouche died at the age of sixty-eight in Lake Charles and is interred there at Sallier Cemetery.

In 1986, Edward and Virginia Carmouche co-authored the book Kindred, about their Carmouche, Lanier, and Martin families. In 1992, Virginia Carmouche wrote The Life of Edward M. Carmouche, a biography of her husband.

References

1921 births
1990 deaths
Politicians from Lake Charles, Louisiana
Louisiana Democrats
Louisiana State Democratic Chairmen
Louisiana lawyers
Businesspeople from Louisiana
Louisiana State University alumni
University of Virginia School of Law alumni
Tulane University Law School alumni
United States Army personnel of World War II
United States Army officers
Recipients of the Silver Star
American Presbyterians
20th-century American lawyers
20th-century American non-fiction writers
Burials in Louisiana
20th-century American businesspeople